Titi (born 9 September 2002), is a Brazilian professional football player who plays as a defender for Guarani.

References

External links

2002 births
Living people
Brazilian footballers
Association football defenders
Guarani FC players
Campeonato Brasileiro Série B players